The Duke of Lancaster's Regiment (King's, Lancashire and Border) (LANCS) is an infantry regiment of the line within the British Army, part of the King's Division. Headquartered in Preston, it recruits throughout the North West of England. The title of Duke of Lancaster merged with the Crown on the accession of Henry V in 1413 and remains dormant, subject to any future revival. Customarily, however, the Sovereign (whether male or female) is referred to as the Duke of Lancaster within Lancashire and in relation to the Duchy of Lancaster, and is the regiment's Colonel in Chief. The Duke of Lancaster's Regiment is the county regiment for Cumbria, Lancashire, Greater Manchester, Merseyside and the Isle of Man, and as such, recruits mainly from these areas.

In 2021 the regiment gained negative coverage in British media and parliament after journalists found that soldiers of the regiment had made jokes in Facebook group chats mocking the murder of Agnes Wanjiru, a Kenyan who was allegedly killed by a soldier of the regiment. Both the family of the victim and soldiers within the Duke of Lancaster's Regiment have accused the British military of covering up her murder.

History

Early history
The regiment's formation was announced on 16 December 2004 by Geoff Hoon and General Sir Mike Jackson as part of the restructuring of the infantry, when it was initially to be known as the King's Lancashire and Border Regiment. The regiment was given its new name in November 2005. Initially formed of three regular army battalions, it was eventually reduced to two regular battalions, plus an Army Reserve battalion. The regiment was formed through the merger of three single battalion regiments:
The King's Own Royal Border Regiment
The King's Regiment
The Queen's Lancashire Regiment

The regiment was formed on 1 July 2006. Initially, on formation, the regiment contained three regular battalions, with each battalion simply being renamed:
1st Battalion, Queen's Lancashire Regiment – 1st Battalion, The Duke of Lancaster's Regiment
1st Battalion, King's Regiment – 2nd Battalion, The Duke of Lancaster's Regiment
1st Battalion, King's Own Royal Border Regiment – 3rd Battalion, The Duke of Lancaster's Regiment
In March 2007, the 3rd Battalion was disbanded, with its personnel dispersed to the other two, leaving the final roll of two regular battalions and one Reserve battalion.

Torture conviction 
Corporal Donald Payne, amalgamated into the regiment after its formation, became Britain's first convicted war criminal under the provisions of the International Criminal Court Act 2001 after pleading guilty to abusing Iraqi detainees, including involvement in the death of Baha Mousa as part of the Queen's Lancashire Regiment.

Recent history
In 2019 the family of Alan Watts, a soldier belonging to the Duke of Lancaster's Regiment who had committed suicide, blamed the army for his death.

In 2021 a colour sergeant from 4th Battalion, the Duke of Lancaster's Regiment was fined and dismissed for lifting the skirt of a Kenyan woman, whom he knew, in a shopping mall in Nanyuki while intoxicated.

In December 2021, the regiment's 2nd Battalion re-subordinated to the Ranger Regiment, as its 3rd Battalion.

Murder of Agnes Wanjiru 
In 2012 a Kenyan mother called Agnes Wanjiru was allegedly murdered by soldiers of the Duke of Lancaster Regiment, with the murder reportedly covered up by British Army officials. After she accompanied British soldiers into the Lions Court Hotel bar in Nanyuki, her naked corpse was found in a septic tank next to the room that soldiers of the Duke of Lancaster had stayed. Many British newspapers reported Agnes Wanjiru to be a prostitute, claims which have been disputed by her surviving family. Due to the advanced decay of her corpse, the post-mortem examination was unable to confirm whether or not she had been sexually assaulted prior to her death. Some British newspapers reported that a soldier of the regiment confessed to being involved in the killing but was told to "shut up" by when he attempted to report it. One of the soldiers within the regiment accused a fellow soldier of being party to the murder.

Despite a Kenyan inquest finding that she had been "unlawfully killed" and the judge presiding finding that British soldiers had murdered her, no soldiers have been charged or convicted for the killing.

Defence secretary Ben Wallace denied that the British military had covered-up Wanjiru's murder, but admitted guilt to and expressed concern over the Army hierarchy turning a "blind eye" to the use of prostitutes by personnel, especially within “countries in poverty”.

In 2021 screenshots of a private Facebook group chat allegedly run by soldiers of the Duke of Lancaster's Regiment was published across British newspapers. The screenshots reportedly showed the regiment's soldiers joking and laughing at memes mocking the murder of Agnes Wanjiru. Soldiers of the regiment posted photographs of the outside of the hotel where Wanjiru was murdered with the caption "if you know you know" followed my laughing emojis. Other comments apparently mocking Agnes Wanjiru's murder include one soldier who commented "septic tank" with ghost emojis and various jokes about sore throats. The same soldier who allegedly murdered Agnes Wanjiru posted: "Come to think of it I have had a sore throat today." The leaking of the secret chats apparently mocking the murder sparked a reinvestigation into the case by Kenyan police.

Regimental Structure
The regiment is split into a 1st and 4th Battalion, and the Regimental Headquarters is located in Fulwood Barracks, Preston. The 1st Battalion is a light role infantry battalion based in Chester. The 4th Battalion is the regiment's reserve battalion and is based across the regimental recruiting area, as part of 4th Infantry Brigade.

Regimental museum
There are five regimental museum collections based around the antecedent regiments:
The King's Own Royal Regiment Museum is based within Lancaster City Museum.
The King's Regiment collection is housed in the Museum of Liverpool.
The Liverpool Scottish Museum Archive is based in Liverpool city centre.
The Lancashire Infantry Museum is based at Fulwood Barracks in Preston.
Cumbria's Museum of Military Life is located in Carlisle Castle.
The Museum of the Manchester Regiment is based in Ashton Town Hall.

Battle honours

Infantry regiments are permitted to display 43 battle honours from the two world wars on the Queen's Colour and 46 honours from other conflicts on the Regimental Colour. Upon amalgamation, the Duke of Lancaster's Regiment had to choose from the total list of honours of its three antecedents which honours would be displayed on its new colours. The chosen honours were:

Queen's Colour
Mons; Retreat from Mons; Marne 1914, 18; Aisne 1914, 18; Messines 1914, 17, 18; Ypres 1914, 15, 17, 18; Neuve Chapelle; Loos; Somme 1916, 18; Arras 1917, 18; Scarpe 1917, 18; Cambrai 1917, 18; Lys; Hindenburg Line; Vittorio Veneto; Macedonia 1915–18; Sari Bair; Gallipoli 1915–16; Megiddo; Kut al Amara 1917; Baghdad; Kilimanjaro; Dunkirk; Normandy Landing; Falaise; Arnhem 1944; Lower Maas; Ourthe; Reichswald; Defence of Habbaniya; Tobruk 1941; Madagascar; Gueriat el Atach Ridge; Landing in Sicily; Anzio; Cassino II; Malta 1940–42; Singapore Island;  Chindits 1943; North Arakan; Chindits 1944; Imphal; Kohima; Nyaungu Bridgehead; Burma 1943–45
Regimental Colour
Namur 1695; Gibraltar 1704–5; Blenheim; Ramillies; Oudenarde; Malplaquet; Dettingen; Louisburg; Guadeloupe 1759; Quebec 1759; Maida; Monte Video; Vimiera; Corunna; Arroyo dos Molinos; Tarifa; Badajoz; Salamanca; Vittoria; St Sebastian; Pyrenees; Nivelle; Nive; Guadeloupe 1810; Java; Bladensburg; Niagara; Waterloo; Bhurtpore; Candahar 1842; Cabool 1842; Maharajpore; New Zealand 1845–47; Alma; Inkerman; Sevastopol; Canton; Delhi 1857; Lucknow; New Zealand 1860–68; Abyssinia; Ahmad Khel; Afghanistan 1878–80; Defence of Kimberley; Defence of Ladysmith; Relief of Ladysmith; Afghanistan 1919; Korea 1952–53; The Hook 1953

In addition to the displayed honours, the regimental colour will also display four emblems from the antecedents regiments:

Lion of England – displayed top left; from the King's Own Royal Border Regiment
White Horse of Hanover – displayed top right; from the King's Regiment
Red Rose charged with the Prince of Wales's feathers – displayed bottom left; from the Lancashire Regiment (Prince of Wales's Volunteers)
Red Rose charged with the Royal Crest – displayed bottom right; from the Loyal Regiment (North Lancashire)

In addition, the Regimental Colour also features a Sphinx to distinguish the battle honour "Egypt" and a Dragon for the honour "China".

Golden threads
The regiment has brought forward a number of Golden Threads from its antecedents, as displays of its history and heritage:
Lion of England – the English Lion, facing inwards as worn by the King's Own Royal Regiment, has been adopted as the regiment's collar badge. The Lion of England is known as the regiment's "Ancient Badge" and provides inspiration for the regimental nickname – first adopted by the 2nd Battalion in August 2009 – "Lions of England". The lion is also used on the regiment's tactical recognition flash.
Glider Flash – the glider awarded, 1949, as an honour to the Border Regiment, for glider landings in Sicily on 9 July 1943, is worn on the sleeve of No. 1 and No. 2 dress. The glider also formed the regiment's tactical recognition flash from its formation until 2014. 
Fleur-de-Lys – the fleur-de-lys worn by the King's Regiment is featured on the regiment's buttons.

Kingsman
Alongside a few other regiments in the British army that use traditional names other than Private for the lowest rank, The Duke of Lancaster's Regiment uses the rank Kingsman (Kgn) instead of Private, a tradition inherited from the King's Regiment (itself having inherited the tradition from the King's Regiment (Liverpool)). Its use has been officially sanctioned since 1951, but it was informally used before this for over one hundred years.

Regimental Colonels
Regimental Colonels were as follows:
 2006–2009: Major General Hamish Rollo, CBE 
 2009–2013: Brig. Michael Griffiths, CBE QPM 
 2013–2018: Brig. Peter S. Rafferty, MBE
 2018–present: Brig. Frazer M. Lawrence, OBE, QCVS

Lineage

Alliances
 – The Royal Regiment of Canada
 – The King's Own Calgary Regiment (RCAC)
 – The Royal Queensland Regiment
 – 1st and 15th Battalions, The Frontier Force Regiment
 – The Royal South Australia Regiment
 – The Otago and Southland Regiment
 – 5th Battalion, The Sikh Regiment
 – The Princess of Wales' Own Regiment
 – The West Nova Scotia Regiment
 – The Loyal Edmonton Regiment (4th Battalion, Princess Patricia's Canadian Light Infantry)
 – The Royal Tasmania Regiment
 – The Wellington (City of Wellington's Own) and Hawke's Bay Regiment
 – 8th and 14th Battalions, The Punjab Regiment
 – 2nd Battalion, The Royal Malay Regiment
 – The Kimberley Regiment
 – HMS Cumberland
 – HMS Liverpool
 – HMS Manchester
 – HMS Lancaster

Freedoms
The regiment have received the Freedom of several locations throughout its history; these include:

  1 July 2006: Pendle (Originally Granted to an antecedent regiment The Queen's Lancashire Regiment in 2001).
  2006: Haslingden
  2006: Warrington
  2007: Chorley 
  17 April 2007: Tameside
  14 September 2008: Liverpool.
  12 October 2009: Knowsley
  16 April 2010: Manchester
  10 March 2011: Ribble Valley
  22 October 2011: West Lancashire
  20 May 2013: Whitehaven
  20 May 2015: Maryport 
  20 June 2017: Sefton
  18 July 2017: Appleby-in-Westmorland
  July 2017: Blackpool
  2 December 2019: Wigan

Order of precedence

Footnotes

References

External links
Main Website

 
Infantry regiments of the British Army
Military units and formations in Lancashire
Military units and formations established in 2006
Military units and formations of the United Kingdom in the War in Afghanistan (2001–2021)